Thomas Ashburnham (by 1462 – 1523), of Guestling and Winchelsea, Sussex and London, was an English politician.

His son was John Ashburnham, also an MP for Winchelsea.

Ashburnham was Mayor of Winchelsea in 1509–1510 and 1521–1522. He was a Member of Parliament (MP) for Winchelsea in 1510 and 1523.

References

English MPs 1510
English MPs 1523
People from Winchelsea
15th-century births
1523 deaths
Mayors of Winchelsea
Year of birth uncertain
People from Guestling